Agnes Jeruto Barsosio is a Kenyan athlete and marathon runner. She was born in 1983. She competes for the Kenya national team and represents Kenya in international athletics competitions.

Career
In 2008, she was the second best athlete in the Lille Half Marathon and won the Foulees Monterelaises. 
She finished second in the 10 km race at Taroudant. In the same year, she debuted on the Düsseldorf Marathon and won the race. In April 2012, Agnes competed in the 10th Metro Group Marathon Düsseldorf. This was her debut in the marathon and she both won and set a new course record in a time of 2:25:49, surpassing the previous record by just under a minute.

On 6 May 2017, Barsosio competed in the sixth edition of České Budějovice Half Marathon held in České Budějovice, Czech Republic. She emerged winner and set a new course record with a time of 1:09:53 after defeating fellow Kenyan female athletes, Rebecca Cheris and Lucy Wangui Kabuu. On June 3, 2017, she competed in the Budweis half marathon, where she reached a new personal best of 01:09:56. On June 25, 2017, she set a new race record in the sixth Ceske Budejovice Half Marathon, an IAAF Gold Label Road Race, in a record time of 1:09:53. This achievement broke the previous record of 1:10:40 set last year by Ashete Bekere of Ethiopia.

References

External links
 

1983 births
Living people
Kenyan female long-distance runners
Kenyan female marathon runners
Place of birth missing (living people)